John Daniel Runkle (October 11, 1822 – July 8, 1902) was a U.S. educator and mathematician. He served as acting president of MIT from 1868–70 and president between 1870 and 1878.

Biography
Professor Runkle was born at Root, New York State. He worked on his father's farm until he was of age, and then studied and taught until he entered the Lawrence Scientific School of Harvard University, where he graduated in 1851. His ability as a mathematician led in 1849 to his appointment as assistant in the preparation of the American Ephemeris and Nautical Almanac, in which he continued to engage until 1884. He was professor of mathematics in the Massachusetts Institute of Technology from 1865 until his retirement in 1902. Runkle become aware of the work of Victor Della-Vos's work in Russia at the Philadelphia Centennial Exhibition in 1876, he was impressed by the combination of theoretical and practical learning.  Manual training was introduced into the institute curriculum largely at his instance. He founded the Mathematical Monthly in 1859 and continued its publication until 1861, and he had charge of the astronomical department of the Illustrated Pilgrim's Almanac.

In the town of Brookline, Massachusetts, Runkle was a chairman of the School Committee and an early advocate of mathematics and technical education. He received an LL.D from Wesleyan University, in Middletown, Connecticut

Works
 New Tables for Determining the Values of Coefficients in the Perturbative Function of Planetary Motion (Washington, 1856)
 The Manual Element in Education (1882), reprinted from the Reports of the Massachusetts Board of Education
 Report on Industrial Education (1883)
 Elements of Plane and Solid Analytic Geometry (Boston, 1888)

Memorials
John D. Runkle School, an elementary school located at 50 Druce Street in Brookline, was established in his name in 1897.

Family
His brother, Cornelius A. Runkle (9 December 1832 in Montgomery County, New York–19 March 1888 in New York City) graduated from Harvard Law School in 1855, and began practice in New York City.  He was subsequently made deputy collector and given charge of the law division of the New York Custom House. This rendered him familiar with the legal questions involved in tariff and internal revenue litigation, and resulted in his devoting himself largely to that class of business. For about twenty-five years, he acted as counsel for the New York Tribune association.  Cornelius's wife, Lucia Isabella Gilbert Runkle (born in North Brookfield, Massachusetts on August 20, 1844), was an editorial writer and contributor to the Tribune.

Notes

References

 

Presidents of the Massachusetts Institute of Technology
Massachusetts Institute of Technology School of Science faculty
American science writers
People from Montgomery County, New York
People from Brookline, Massachusetts
Harvard School of Engineering and Applied Sciences alumni
Wesleyan University people
1822 births
1902 deaths
School board members in Massachusetts